The Australian Open in badminton, is an international open held in Australia. In 2011, it was upgraded to a Grand Prix Gold level event. Between 2014 and 2017, the Australian Open was promoted to a Super Series event. From 2018 to 2022, it is a Super 300 event of the BWF World Tour. From 2023 onwards, this will be a Super 500 tournament.

Previous winners

Performances by nation

Note

References

External links 
 BWF: 2006 results
 BWF: 2007 results

 
Badminton tournaments in Australia
BWF World Tour